Rolf Lennart Johansson (7 June 1941 – 23 October 2010) was a Swedish ice hockey defender. He was a key figure in Brynäs IF, winning seven national titles as a player (1964, 1966–68 and 1970–72) and then one as a coach in 1980. Internationally he competed only at the 1964 Winter Olympics, where he won a silver medal.

After retiring from competitions Johansson worked as a coach, and prepared the Swedish team to the 1976 World Championships. He was later employed at the Culture & Recreation department of the Gävle municipality.

References

1941 births
Olympic medalists in ice hockey
Olympic ice hockey players of Sweden
Olympic silver medalists for Sweden
Ice hockey players at the 1964 Winter Olympics
2010 deaths
Medalists at the 1964 Winter Olympics
People from Sundsvall
Sportspeople from Västernorrland County